Prom is the second solo album by Amy Ray of Indigo Girls, released in 2005 on her Daemon Records label.

Track listing
All songs written by Amy Ray
"Put It Out for Good" – 3:50
"Driver Education" – 2:21
"Rural Faggot" – 3:54
"Give In" – 1:59
"Covered for You" – 4:56
"Blender" – 2:06
"Sober Girl" – 3:02
"Pennies on the Track" – 3:49
"Rodeo" – 3:00
"Let It Ring" – 3:11

References

Amy Ray albums
2005 albums
Daemon Records albums